Hakan Sürsal (born 12 July 1963 in Ankara) is a Turkish poet.

Biography
Turkish writer of short stories, novels, essays ,and poetry. Hakan Sürsal graduated from the Geology Department of Istanbul University in Istanbul. Politics, history, and philosophy are the main sources of Sürsal's books.

Hakan Sürsal, his own fiction in the language of the new breath of contemporary Turkish literature.

Bibliography
 station/soot bowl direction (is'tas'yön) - poetry 
 asexual Rodin (eşeysiz Rodin) - poetry 
 dark room smiles (karanlıkoda gülücükleri) - poetry 
 cigarettes and crows (sigaralar ve kargalar) - short stories 
 the blue infirmary (mavi revir) - poetry 
 sound, soup and fresh bread (ses,çorba ve taze ekmek) - poetry
 the joke (şaka) - essay
 bird tip (kuş ucu) - poetry
 take me to the old plane tree (beni yaşlı çınar'a götür) - novel
 browse gaps (göz boşlukları) - short stories / essay
 elephant with flowers (çiçekli fil) - poetry
 paper child (kâğıt çocuk) - novel
 raves about dying" (ölmek hakkında övgüler) - short stories

References

Turkish poets
Turkish writers
Living people
1963 births
People from Ankara